Fatma Khanum Kamina (born 1841, Shusha, Shusha Uyezd, Shamakhi Governorate, Russian Empire - died 1898, Shusha, Shusha Uyezd, Russian Empire) was one of the famous Azerbaijani women poetees during XIX century.

Life 
She was born in 1841 in Shusha. Her father Mirza Beybaba Fana was also a poet. She was educated in Shusha. She was called "Mirza Fatma Khanum" by the people because of her education. Most of her poems are written in classical form. Mir Mohsun Navvab stated in "Tazkireyi-Navvab" that Fatma khanum had 400 poems. Fatma took an active part in the "Mejlisi-Faramushan" gatherings of Shusha intellectuals led by Mir Mohsun Navvab and in the "Mejlisi-uns" literary circle.

She died in 1898 in Shusha. Writing about her death, Firidun bey Kocharli called her "one of the rare people of the time".

Family 
She was from Tahirovs, one of the noble families of Shusha. She was a relative of Tahira Tahirova (Foreign Minister of Azerbaijan Soviet Socialist Republic) and  Mirza Hasan Tahirzadeh (fourth Sheikh ul-Islam of the Caucasus).

See also 
 Gonchabegüm Nakhchivanski

References

1841 births
1898 deaths
Azerbaijani-language women poets
Writers from Shusha